Lake Panamint (also known as Lake Gale) is a former lake that occupied Panamint Valley in California during the Pleistocene. It was formed mainly by water overflowing through the Owens River and which passed through Lake Searles into the Panamint Valley. At times, Lake Panamint itself overflowed into Death Valley and Lake Manly.

Geography and geomorphology 

The lake developed within Panamint Valley, California. This valley is a north–south trending depression that is bound between the Panamint Range in the northeast and the Argus Range-Slate Range in the west-southwest. The town of Ballarat lies in the valley, and California State Route 190 crosses the former lake basin in its northern sector. The existence of a lake in this valley was first postulated in 1914.

Both the main inlet and the potential outlet were located in a narrower southern part.

A number of shorelines have been identified in the valley, indicating variable water levels.

Geology 

The Panamint Valley lies in the southern Basin and Range Province, which has been subject to extensive Quaternary tectonic activity characterized by crustal extension along normal faults as well as strike-slip fault activity. Volcanic activity between 7.7 and 4 million years ago preceded the opening of the valley, leaving basalts stranded on either side. Subsequently, the Panamint Valley Fault Zone triggered subsidence of the valley floor and the separation of the formerly connected Darwin Plateau and Panamint Ranges.

Tufa deposits have been found in the Panamint Valley, some of which form fringing reefs and algal mounds. Lake Panamint has left clay, marl and silt deposits in Panamint Valley. Cobble beaches developed at the Nadeau Road and Lower Water Canyon localities, while wave-cut terraces were identified close to Ballarat and Big Four Mine Road and delta deposits close to Panamint Springs.

Hydrology 

The deserts of the Southwestern United States were not always as dry as today. During the ice ages, large lakes such as Lake Bonneville and Lake Lahontan developed in the Great Basin of the United States because of changes in the weather patterns of the region. In these times, the Laurentide Ice Sheet expanded and displaced the jet stream.

Inflow 

Lake Panamint was part of a chain of lakes that started with Owens Lake and continued through China Lake and Searles Lake into Lake Panamint. During wet periods, the upstream lakes would overflow and fill the downstream lakes until the latter overflowed as well into the next lake. The source of this water was ultimately the Sierra Nevada and cations transported by this water have left their traces in the Panamint Valley. Such overflow episodes occurred four times between 700,000 and 350,000 years ago and then again 150,000, 120,000, 24,000 and 10,000 years ago, usually during periods where glaciers expanded on the Sierra Nevada; the last time where such water reached the Panamint Valley was 23,500 years before present.

During oxygen isotope stage 4 Lake Panamint was filled by groundwater, which comes in part from the Sierra Nevada and in part from the Panamint Range. There are also some hot springs that show evidence of geothermal heating and in general spring discharge sites close to faults are associated with peculiar coastal environments. Desert drainages also added water to Lake Panamint, some of these are still active today.

Overflow 

Overflow from Lake Panamint was a principal source of water for Lake Manly during the time the overflow was active. When such overflow occurred is unclear but apparently was restricted to oxygen isotope stage 6; during oxygen isotope stage 2 Lake Panamint was the terminal basin for the Owens River and no overflow occurred after about 30,000 years before present.

Biology 

Charophytes and widgeonweeds grew in Lake Panamint.

Freshwater snail and other gastropod fossils have been found in lake deposits such as tufa; genera found at Lake Panamint include Amnicola, Helisoma, Lymnaea, Valvata and Vorticifex. Fecal pellets from brine shrimps have been found in lake deposits.

Various fish such as suckers (Catostomus) and Western chubs (Gila and Siphateles) inhabited the lake when it was overflowing. Today they still occur in the Owens River system. When Lake Panamint existed, California voles used the rivers reaching to and from the lake to propagate across the desert.

Ostracods also lived in the lake waters, including Candona, Cyprideis and Limnocythere species. During shallow water periods, foraminifera also populated the lake, and the presence of diatoms and other planktonic fossils was reported already in the 1950s.

During the most recent highstand of Lake Panamint, humans occupied its shorelines and left stone tools. Chipped-stone crescents, a common archeological artifact in California, have been found on the former shores of Lake Panamint and geoglyphs have been observed in the northern sector of Lake Panamint.

Lake history 

Panamint Valley was flooded about five times over the last 100,000 years, coinciding with glacial periods. These lake stages have been assigned letter codes from oldest to youngest, "E", "F", "G", "H" and "I"; their chronology is often uncertain. Lake stages at Lake Panamint coincided with the Tahoe and Tioga glacier advances in the Sierra Nevada.

It is possible however that around 22,600 ± 130 years ago Lake Panamint was split into a northern basin sourced from local drainages and a southern one receiving water from Lake Searles. By 15,050 ± 80 years ago Lake Panamint began to recede as overflow from Searles ceased. By 14,925 radiocarbon years ago Lake Panamint was definitively receding.

Presently, the Panamint Valley is considered to be part of physiographical region of the Sonoran Desert and contains two playas, South Panamint Playa and North Panamint Playa. Panamint Spring and Warm Sulphurs Spring are active in the northwestern and east-central sectors of the valley.

References

Sources 

 
 
 
 
 
 
 
 

Panamint
Panamint
Death Valley National Park